Morrow County is a county located in the central portion of the U.S. state of Ohio. As of the 2020 census, the population was 34,950. Its county seat is Mount Gilead. The county was organized in 1848 from parts of four neighboring counties and named for Jeremiah Morrow who was the Governor of Ohio from 1822 to 1826. Shawnee people used the area for hunting purposes before white settlers arrived in the early 19th century.

Morrow County is included in the Columbus, OH Metropolitan Statistical Area.

In 2010, the center of population of Ohio was located in Morrow County, near the village of Marengo.

Morrow County's historic World War I Victory Shaft, unique in the United States, is located in the center of downtown Mount Gilead. Other areas interesting to the tourist include: Mount Gilead State Park; Amish farms and businesses near Johnsville and Chesterville; the Mid-Ohio Sports Car Course  near Steam Corners; the rolling Allegheny foothills of eastern Morrow County; the site of the birthplace of President Warren G. Harding near Blooming Grove; the site of the former Ohio Central College in Iberia; the early 19th-century architecture of buildings in Chesterville, Ohio; the Revolutionary War Soldiers' Memorial in Mount Gilead; the Civil War monument in Cardington; and the mid-19th-century architecture of the Morrow County Courthouse and Old Jail in Mount Gilead.

Geography
Morrow County is considered to be a part of "Mid Ohio."

Adjacent counties
 Crawford County (north)
 Richland County (northeast)
 Knox County (southeast)
 Delaware County (southwest)
 Marion County (west)

Water features

Ossing Run is a tributary of Shaw Creek that flows through Morrow County, Ohio. Shaw Creek flows into Whetstone Creek which is located adjacent to Cardington, Ohio. The United States Geological Survey’s Geographic Names Information System (GNIS) classifies Ossing Run as a stream with an identification number of 2761345.  The feature name was entered into the GNIS system in April 2014.

Demographics

2000 census
As of the census of 2000, there were 31,628 people, 11,499 households, and 8,854 families living in the county. The population density was 78 people per square mile (30/km2). There were 12,132 housing units at an average density of 30 per square mile (12/km2). The racial makeup of the county was 98.37% White, 0.27% Black or African American, 0.30% Native American, 0.15% Asian, 0.18% from other races, and 0.74% from two or more races. 0.58% of the population were Hispanic or Latino of any race.

There were 11,499 households, out of which 35.60% had children under the age of 18 living with them, 64.60% were married couples living together, 8.10% had a female householder with no husband present, and 23.00% were non-families. 19.00% of all households were made up of individuals, and 7.90% had someone living alone who was 65 years of age or older. The average household size was 2.72 and the average family size was 3.09.

In the county, the population was spread out, with 27.30% under the age of 18, 7.60% from 18 to 24, 29.30% from 25 to 44, 24.30% from 45 to 64, and 11.50% who were 65 years of age or older. The median age was 36 years. For every 100 females there were 99.40 males. For every 100 females age 18 and over, there were 98.00 males.

The median income for a household in the county was $40,882, and the median income for a family was $45,747. Males had a median income of $33,129 versus $22,454 for females. The per capita income for the county was $17,830. About 6.60% of families and 9.00% of the population were below the poverty line, including 12.40% of those under age 18 and 7.10% of those age 65 or over.

2010 census
As of the 2010 United States Census, there were 34,827 people, 12,855 households, and 9,578 families living in the county. The racial makeup of the county was 97.7% white, 0.3% Asian, 0.1% American Indian, 0.2% from other races, and 1.3% from two or more races. Those of Hispanic or Latino origin made up 1.1% of the population. In terms of ancestry, 30.8% were German, 16.1% were American, 14.4% were Irish, and 13.3% were English.

Of the 12,855 households, 35.1% had children under the age of 18 living with them, 59.5% were married couples living together, 9.5% had a female householder with no husband present, 25.5% were non-families, and 20.7% of all households were made up of individuals. The average household size was 2.68 and the average family size was 3.08. The median age was 39.5 years.

The median income for a household in the county was $49,891 and the median income for a family was $55,980. Males had a median income of $41,096 versus $32,911 for females. The per capita income for the county was $20,795. About 7.5% of families and 10.8% of the population were below the poverty line, including 13.9% of those under age 18 and 9.5% of those age 65 or over.

Politics
Morrow County is a Republican stronghold county. The last time it voted for a Democratic candidate was Lyndon B. Johnson in 1964.

|}

Government

Communities

Cities
 Galion (part)

Villages
 Cardington
 Chesterville
 Edison
 Fulton
 Marengo
 Mount Gilead (county seat)
 Sparta

Townships

 Bennington
 Canaan
 Cardington
 Chester
 Congress
 Franklin
 Gilead
 Harmony
 Lincoln
 North Bloomfield
 Perry
 Peru
 South Bloomfield
 Troy
 Washington
 Westfield

https://web.archive.org/web/20160715023447/http://www.ohiotownships.org/township-websites

Census-designated places
 Candlewood Lake
 Hidden Lakes
 Iberia

Unincorporated communities

 Bloomfield
 Blooming Grove
 Climax
 Denmark
 Fargo
 Johnsville
 North Woodbury
 Pagetown
 Pulaskiville
 Saint James
 Shawtown
 Shauck
 South Woodbury
 Steam Corners
 Vails Corners
 West Liberty
 West Point
 Westfield
 Williamsport

Notable residents
 Chilton C. Baker, politician
 Tim Belcher, former Major League Baseball pitcher
 Richard Dillingham, Quaker abolitionist
 Frank W. Gunsaulus, pastor
 Albert P. Halfhill, businessman, father of the tuna packing industry was born in the county.
 Warren G. Harding, U.S. President
 Dawn Powell, author
 Esther Tuttle Pritchard (1840–1900), minister, editor
 Samuel Newitt Wood, politician and women's rights advocate

See also
 National Register of Historic Places listings in Morrow County, Ohio

References

External links
 Morrow County Government's website

 
1848 establishments in Ohio
Populated places established in 1848